"Heroes (We Could Be)" is a song by Swedish DJ and record producer Alesso, featuring the vocals of Swedish singer Tove Lo. Released on 22 August 2014, the song has charted in a number of countries. In the US, the song went to number one on the dance chart.

Background
In an interview with Billboard, Alesso explained the song: "When Tove Lo and I first started working together, she'd tell me about how she wanted to be different, to stand out as an artist. And on some level, I think everyone goes through that. As a teenager, I was always wondering about who I was, what was my identity, did I secretly wish I was someone else. But as you [age], you realize that it's not about being someone else." When asked what inspired the song's lyrics, he continued, "My team and I reached out to [Lo] to see if she'd be interested in a collaboration, and a couple months later, we began writing the lyrics that would go over these instrumentals. We discussed what it should be about -- we knew it should be an emotional record -- and this gorgeous girl came back with this gorgeous topline."

Even though the song's melody bears no similarity to David Bowie's 1977 single ""Heroes"", his and Brian Eno's names were added to the song's writing credits in July 2015. Alesso told the Daily Star: "I just didn't want to get sued. They aren't similar, but we needed protection in case we pissed off Bowie."

Music video
The music video was released on 10 October 2014. Similar to the 2006 TV series of the same name, it introduces teenagers with supernatural abilities, who are detained in a high security institute. An angel, portrayed by Tove Lo, is being kept under strict supervision as scientists compel her to swallow drugs designed to remove her powers. Meanwhile, Alesso runs toward and enters the facility and to release the angelic woman. As he walks past the super human teens, they exhibit their abilities and break free. This triggers an alarm, allowing him and the woman to escape from the scientists. As they approach the top of the building, they decide to fall. As they fall, the angel flies away. However, Alesso falls on a car and perishes. The final scene involves the teens escaping into the night.

Charts and certifications

Weekly charts

Year-end charts

Decade-end charts

Certifications

See also
 List of number-one dance singles of 2014 (U.S.)

External links
Full Lyrics at LyricsOnDemand.com

References

2014 singles
2014 songs
Alesso songs
Tove Lo songs
Songs written by Tove Lo
Songs written by David Bowie
Song recordings produced by Alesso